Roaring Lambs (released in 2000) is a collaborative album based on the book, Roaring Lambs: A Gentle Plan to Radically Change Your World, by Bob Briner. Conceived and directed Dave Palmer, and produced by Steve Taylor, the recording includes a number of CCM artists' musical interpretations of Briner's message about the need to have a positive impact on their culture. The work was nominated for three GMA Dove awards, winning for "Recorded Music Packaging of the Year". Critical reception of the album was mixed, but it was noted for its eclectic artist pairings.

Track listing
"Headstrong" - Jars of Clay
"Salt and Light" - Ashley Cleveland and Michael Tait
"Out There" - Steven Curtis Chapman and Michael W. Smith
"One Thing" - Ginny Owens and Brent Bourgeois
"Shortstop" - Steve Taylor
'Kingdom Come" - PFR
"'Akehlulek' Ubaba (With God Everything is Possible)" - Ladysmith Black Mambazo and Charlie Peacock
"Touch" - Delirious?
"Daisies and Roses" - Burlap to Cashmere
"Goodbye" - Over the Rhine
"Wondering Where the Lions Are" - Bill Mallonee and Vigilantes of Love
"The Ground You Shook" - Sixpence None the Richer

References

Contemporary Christian music compilation albums
2000 compilation albums